Miguel Ángel Gallardo Valles (born July 8, 1981) is a tennis player from Mexico.

He won two ATP Challenger event in 2001 and 2004 in Puebla and he played for the Mexican Davis Cup squad in 2011

Gallardo Valles was banned for 55 days in 2005 after testing positive for cannabis.

ATP Challenger and ITF Futures finals

Singles: 50 (18–32)

Doubles: 43 (21–22)

References

Sources

Living people
1981 births
Mexican male tennis players
Sportspeople from Chihuahua (state)
Doping cases in tennis
Competitors at the 2002 Central American and Caribbean Games
Central American and Caribbean Games medalists in tennis
Central American and Caribbean Games gold medalists for Mexico
Central American and Caribbean Games bronze medalists for Mexico
Tennis players at the 2003 Pan American Games
Pan American Games competitors for Mexico
20th-century Mexican people
21st-century Mexican people